Manhay is a hamlet in the parish of Wendron (where the population at the 2011 census was included.) in south Cornwall, England, UK.

References

Hamlets in Cornwall